The Courageous is an epithet borne by:

 Albert III, Duke of Saxony (1443–1500)
 Bayburtlu Kara Ibrahim Pasha, Grand Vizier of the Ottoman Empire from 1683 to 1685, Ottoman governor of Egypt from 1669 to 1673
 Godfrey I, Count of Louvain (c. 1060–1139), Landgrave of Brabant, Count of Brussels and Leuven, Duke of Lower Lorraine and Margrave of Antwerp 
 Henry I, Duke of Brabant (c. 1165–1235)
 Kara Musa Pasha (died 1649),  Ottoman Grand Vizier of the Ottoman Empire, Kapudan Pasha (commander-in-chief of the Ottoman navy)
 Kara Mustafa Pasha (1634/1635–1683), Ottoman Albanian Grand Vizier of the Ottoman Empire, military leader and governor of Silistria
 Kemankeş Kara Mustafa Pasha (1592–1644), Ottoman Albanian Grand Vizier of the Ottoman Empire, Kapudan Pasha and Janissary officer

See also
 List of people known as the Brave
 List of people known as the Fearless
 List of people known as the Valiant

Lists of people by epithet